Behadi is a village and a Panchayat in Dewas district in the Indian state of Madhya Pradesh. Behadi Village is a major agricultural production area in Madhya Pradesh. Earlier, Harngaon was called Harigarh. India census,

References 

Villages in Dewas district